A business improvement district (BID) is a defined area within which businesses are required to pay an additional tax (or levy) in order to fund projects within the district's boundaries.  The BID is often funded primarily through the levy but can also draw on other public and private funding streams.  BIDs may go by other names, such as business improvement area (BIA), business revitalization zone (BRZ), community improvement district (CID), special services area (SSA), or special improvement district (SID).  These districts typically fund services which are perceived by some businesses as being inadequately performed by government with its existing tax revenues, such as cleaning streets, providing security, making capital improvements, construction of pedestrian and streetscape enhancements, and marketing the area. The services provided by BIDs are supplemental to those already provided by the municipality. The revenue derives from a tax assessment on commercial property owners, and in some cases, residential property owners.

Development
The first BID was the Bloor West Village Business Improvement Area, established in Toronto in 1970 as an initiative by local private business. The first BID in the United States was the Downtown Development District in New Orleans established in 1974, and there were 1,200 across the country by 2011. Other countries with BIDs include Australia, New Zealand, South Africa, Jamaica, Serbia, Albania, Germany, Ireland, Singapore, the Netherlands and the United Kingdom.

The process for creating a BID varies from one jurisdiction to another. In the United States, it generally involves three steps. First, some number of businesses in the area petition the local government to create the BID. Second, the local government determines that a majority of businesses want the BID. Third, the local government enacts legislation creating the BID. Prior to this occurring, state legislatures need to grant local units the authority to create BIDs. The operating budgets of BIDs range from a few thousand dollars to tens of millions of dollars. A BID may be operated by a nonprofit organization or by a quasi-governmental entity. The governance of a BID is the responsibility of a board composed of some combination of property owners, businesses, and government officials. The management of a BID is the job of a paid administrator, usually occupying the position of an executive director of a management company.

BIDs in England and Wales are funded by a levy on the occupiers rather than the owners of the properties within the area. If voted in by local businesses, the BID levy is an extension to existing non-domestic business-rates. "In England and Wales, for a BID to go ahead the ballot must be won on two counts: straight majority and majority of rateable value. In Scotland for a ballot to be successful it must meet four criteria, a minimum turnout of 25% by the number of eligible persons (the headcount) and by rateable value and a majority of those that vote by number of ballots and by rateable value must vote in favour.  This ensures that the interests of large and small businesses are protected."

Distribution

United States
 
By 1996 there were over 1,000 BIDs in the United States. New York City has 76 BIDs, the most of any city; in NYC, BIDs invest $159 million annually in neighborhoods throughout the five boroughs. BIDs exist in almost every one of the top 50 largest cities in the United States, including Los Angeles, Chicago, Houston, Philadelphia, Atlanta, San Francisco, Seattle, and Washington, DC. Minneapolis and Boston have been the last of the top 20 largest regions to adopt a business improvement district. The State of Wisconsin has adopted the most for smaller towns, with about 90 in the state, 25 of those being in Milwaukee and the rest throughout the state.

Canada
In Canada, Toronto has 81 BIAs within its city limit. Montreal – where BIAs are called Sociétés de Développement Commerciale (SDC) – has 17. The City of Winnipeg has 16 "Business Improvement Zones," the first of which were formed in 1987, with the amendment of The City of Winnipeg Act. In the province of Alberta, they are termed "business revitalization zones". There are nine zones in the city of Calgary and 10 in Edmonton. Regina, Saskatchewan has two Business Improvement Districts: Regina Downtown (BID) and The Warehouse District. Saskatoon, Saskatchewan has 4 Business Improvement Districts: The Broadway BID, The Downtown Partnership, The Sutherland BID and The Riversdale BID. Some work has been made on creating a 5th BID in Saskatoon for the area of 33rd Street. It is estimated that there are over 400 BIDs in Canada but no count has been made. There are 8 business improvement districts in the Halifax Regional Municipality.  Halifax Regional Municipality has passed by laws in 2012 regarding the formation and conduct of these BIDs.
The 8 BIDS are: Downtown Halifax Business Commission, Downtown Dartmouth Business Commission, Spring Garden Area Business Association, North End Business Association, Quinpool Road Mainstreet District Association. Sackville Business Association, Spryfield Business Association, Main Street Dartmouth Business Association.

BIDs have also become a powerful lobby group, lobbying government for improvements such as new sidewalks, trees, park benches and other restorations. BIDs can also lobby different levels of government for significant changes to their area if they feel it is necessary to improve business.

UK

In England and Wales, BIDs were introduced through the Local Government Act 2003, and subsequent regulations in 2004. The Circle Initiative, a five-year scheme funded by the London Development Agency, set up the first pilot BIDs, five in London, all of which had successful ballots by March 2006. The first UK BID 'Kingston First' was established in Kingston upon Thames in January 2005. In October 2007 there were 36 proposed or operational BIDs across Greater London, and by late 2014 there were over 180 in operation in the United Kingdom. This number increased to 303 throughout the UK by December 2018.

London

The New West End Company is the management and promotional company for London's Bond Street, Oxford Street and Regent Street. As one of the largest BIDs in Europe, New West End Company brings together the commercial interests of over 600 retailers, property owners and West End businesses working closely with the Mayor of London, Transport for London, Westminster City Council, the Metropolitan Police and local neighbours.

Better Bankside was the third BID to be established in the UK, the second in London and the first south of the river. It was founded in 2005, and underwent a successful re-ballot in 2010 with 82% of businesses in favour. It won awards including Best Visitor Information Initiatives Silver Award in 2008, the Best Community Project 2011 and Best Partnership Award 2012 in the Mayor of London's BID Awards, and was short-listed for Best Marketing & Communications Campaign, Transport for London Smarter Travel Awards 2010. The Better Bankside BID was set up and is managed by The Means, a regeneration consultancy company.

Scotland
Business Improvement Districts Scotland is the national organisation and voice for BIDs in Scotland, responsible for delivering the Scottish Government's BIDs programme, providing central support to developing BIDs, promoting and encouraging the development of BIDs across the country, whilst also working with operational BIDs to assist them in delivering for their local communities and contributing to sustainable inclusive economic growth.

The Scottish Government provides a grant to local groups of up to £20,000 to help with the development of the BID. The legislation in Scotland (The Planning etc. (Scotland) Act 2006) is different from the England and Wales legislation in that it allows property owners as well as occupiers to be included in a BID. There are also differences in the timescales, ballot and reballot criteria, and the legislative requirements of the BID proposer.  In Scotland, for a ballot to be successful it must meet four criteria: a minimum turnout of 25% (by the number of eligible persons and by rateable value); and a majority of those that vote (by number of ballots and by rateable value).

The intention of the Scottish legislation is that BIDs are not restricted to towns and city centres, to allow innovative BIDs to be developed across the country. The consultation of 2003 proposed that the BID model could be used in business parks, tourism and visitor areas, rural areas, agriculture and single-business sectors. The legislation and subsequent regulations were passed by the Scottish Parliament in 2006 and 2007 respectively.

In March 2006, the Scottish Government announced funding for six pilot BIDs in Scotland: Bathgate (town centre), Clackmannanshire (business parks), Edinburgh (city centre), Falkirk (town centre), Glasgow (city centre) and Inverness (city centre). There are currently thirty seven operational BIDs in Scotland with a further twenty four in development. The operational BIDs include thirty one town and city centre BIDs and three business park BIDs.

In March 2014 the first tourism BID was delivered in Loch Ness and Inverness. The first themed BID in Scotland was delivered in December 2013, the Sauchiehall Street Evening Economy BID. In 2016 the world's first food and drink BID was delivered in East Lothian with the levy based on the number of full-time employees, also a first.

The development and interest in the BIDs model in Scotland continues to grow and the flexibility of the legislation and the model is now being recognised with the development of the Borders Railway BIDs Corridor, and four canal BIDs led by Scottish Waterways Trust. In 2017 BIDs Scotland published The National Report on BIDs in Scotland which covers the types of BIDs, number of businesses, levels of employment in BIDs in Scotland and the contribution they make to sustainable and inclusive economic growth.

Germany
Six of the sixteen German Bundeslander (Federal States) introduced the requisite legal framework to create BIDs: Hamburg, Bremen, Hessen, North Rhine-Westphalia, Saarland and Schleswig-Holstein. BID projects in implementation exist only in a few German cities so far – e.g. in Flensburg, Hamburg and Giessen.

Criticism

Whilst BIDs have been heralded for improving the trading environment, BIDs have also received noteworthy criticism.

BIDs have been accused of being unaccountable and by their very nature undemocratic, concentrating power in a geographic area into the hands of the few. Small businesses who fall below the BID levy threshold, although not liable to pay the BID levy, are often priced out of an area because BIDs tend to increase rental values. Larger businesses are more able to absorb these rent increases, particularly the multiple stores.

BIDs have also been criticized in the past by anti-poverty groups for being too harsh on the homeless and poor who may congregate around businesses. BIDs have also been known to be opposed to street vendors such as hot dog vendors and chip wagons. In London, street traders who sold small items to tourists were barred from Oxford Street in London.

President of Civic Voice, Griff Rhys Jones criticised the creation of a BID in central London neighbourhood saying that is undemocratic: "Neither the people who live there, nor the many intriguing small shops and businesses, have been allowed to vote or have even been consulted.". "I am wary of this initiative because of what may become unintended consequences (or indeed intended consequences) that help one sort of business (the property letting business) but will cause problems to smaller businesses and the large and wholly integrated residential population of the district". He also criticised some of the methods to oppose the BID.

See also

  Special-purpose district
  Redevelopment
  Infill

References

Further reading
Becker, C. & Seth A. Grossman, 2010.  "Census of United States BIDs."  International Downtown Association. Washington DC. Home
Becker, C. 2010. Self-Determination, Accountability Mechanisms, and Quasi-Governmental Status of Business Improvement Districts in the United States. "Public Performance & Management Review" 33 (3). Metapress | A Fast Growing Resource for Young Entrepreneurs
Blackwell M. 2005. A critical appraisal of the UK Government's proposals for Business Improvement Districts in England. Journal of Property Management, 23 (3).
Clough, N. and R. Vanderbeck. 2006. Managing Politics and Consumption in Business Improvement Districts: The Geographies of Political Activism on Burlington, Vermont's Church Street Marketplace. Urban Studies, 43 (12), 2261–2284.
Cook, I. R. 2008. Mobilising Urban Policies: The Policy Transfer of US Business Improvement Districts to England and Wales. Urban Studies, 45 (4), 773–795.
Cook, I. R. 2009. Private sector involvement in urban governance: The case of Business Improvement Districts and Town Centre Management partnerships in England. Geoforum, 40 (5), 930–940.
Grossman, S. A. 2010. Elements of public-private partnership management: Examining the promise and performance criteria of Business Improvement Districts, Journal of Town & City Management, 1 (2).
Grossman, S A. 2010. Reconceptualizing the Public Management and Performance of Business Improvement Districts, Public Performance & Management Review, Vol. 33 (3), 355–394.
Grossman, Seth A, 2008. "The Case of Business Improvement Districts: Special District Public-Private Cooperation in Community Revitalization", The Public Performance & Management Review, 32, (2).
Houstoun, Lawrence O., Jr. 2003. BIDs: Business Improvement Districts. Second Edition.  Washington, D.C.: ULI-the Urban Land Institute in cooperation with the International Downtown Association ; Comprehensive introductory text
Hoyt, L. and G. Devika. 2007. The Business Improvement District Model: A Balanced Review of Contemporary Debates, Geography Compass, 1 (4).
Kreutz, S. 2009. Urban Improvement Districts in Germany: New legal instruments for joint proprietor activities in area development. Journal of Urban Regeneration and Renewal, Vol.2,4, 304–317
Minton, Anna. 2008. "Clean and Safe" in Ground Control: Fear and happiness in the twenty-first century, Penguin, pp37–58.
Mitchell, J. 2008. Business Improvement Districts and the Shape of American Cities. Albany: SUNY Press.
Reenstra-Bryant, R. 2010. Evaluations of Business Improvement Districts: Ensuring Relevance for Individual Communities. "Public Performance & Management Review," 33 (3): 509–523. .
Schaller, S. and G. Modan. 2005. Contesting Public Space and Citizenship: Implications for Neighborhood Business Improvement Districts. Journal of Planning Education and Research, 24 (4), 394–407.
Stokes R. 2002. Place management in commercial Areas; The Case of Philadelphia's Customer Service Representatives. "Security Journal". 12, 7–19.
Stokes, R. 2007. Business Improvement Districts and small business advocacy: The case of San Diego's citywide BID program. "Economic Development Quarterly". Vol. 21, No. 3, 278–291.
Ward, K. 2007. Business Improvement Districts: Policy Origins, Mobile Policies and Urban Liveability. Geography Compass, 1 (3).

External links
 The BID Foundation
 The British BIDs website
 Business Improvement Districts: Imagining Urban Futures – Research on the international circulation of the Business Improvement District model.
 Urban Improvement Districts – Research website on BIDs in Germany

Types of geographical division
Neighborhood associations
Community development
Community organizations
Local government